Louis Magrath King (1886–1949) was a British consul in the Dartsedo (Kangding) region of China, which was then a border post between the Chinese Empire and Tibet. King was the son of writer Margaret Williamson King and the grandson of Scottish missionary Alexander Williamson.

In 1919 at Dartsedo, King married Rinchen Lhamo,  who came from a respected family in Kham, Tibet. Theirs is often described as "probably the first Tibetan-British marriage". They had four children together. After Rinchen’s death, Louis went on to marry an English woman named Margaret, and they had several children together including Martin King, who later became a striker for Colchester football team.

King was the author of various books about China and Tibet.

Bibliography
1912 China as it really is: By a resident in Peking, Evelyn Nash
1926 We Tibetans, by Rinchen Lhamo, historical introduction by King. Seeley & Co, London, reprinted in 1985 and 1997.
1927 China in Turmoil – Studies in Personality, Heath Cranton
1937 By Tophet Flare. A tale of adventure on the Chinese frontier of Tibet, Methuen.
1938 The warden of the marches: A tale of adventure on the Chinese frontier of Tibet
1947 Cause and Effect in China, Contemporary Review
1926 A brief account of 1500 years of Tibetan history, reprinted in 1985
19?? The Soldier

References

External links
Louis King (Biographical details), British Museum
Louis Magrath King and Rinchen Lhamo, photo

British diplomats
British writers
British sinologists
1886 births
1949 deaths